Tünde Vaszi (born 18 April 1972 in Érpiskolt, Romania) is a retired Hungarian long jumper. Her greatest success was the bronze medal at the 2002 European Championships in Athletics, and her personal best is 6.86 metres from when she placed fourth at the 2001 World Championships in Edmonton.

She lived in Carei, Romania till 1990 when she has moved to Hungary with her family.

She later took up pole vault, and competed at the 2002 European Indoor Championships. Her current personal best is 4.25 m.

Achievements

Awards
 Hungarian athlete of the Year (6): 1998, 2000, 2001, 2002, 2003, 2004

External links

1972 births
Living people
Hungarian female long jumpers
Romanian sportspeople of Hungarian descent
Athletes (track and field) at the 1996 Summer Olympics
Athletes (track and field) at the 2000 Summer Olympics
Athletes (track and field) at the 2004 Summer Olympics
Olympic athletes of Hungary
European Athletics Championships medalists